

296001–296100 

|-bgcolor=#f2f2f2
| colspan=4 align=center | 
|}

296101–296200 

|-bgcolor=#f2f2f2
| colspan=4 align=center | 
|}

296201–296300 

|-bgcolor=#f2f2f2
| colspan=4 align=center | 
|}

296301–296400 

|-id=351
| 296351 Linyongbin ||  || Lin Yong-Bin (born 1968), a Chinese meteorite hunter and member of the Xinjiang Astronomical Society, who frequently visits the Gobi Desert. || 
|}

296401–296500 

|-id=462
| 296462 Corylachlan ||  || Cory Lachlan Todd (born 1997), son of Australian astronomer Michael Todd who discovered this minor planet || 
|}

296501–296600 

|-id=525
| 296525 Milanovskiy ||  || Aleksandr Evgen'evich Milanovskiy (1950–2004), a famous Russian geologist and meteorite searcher and investigator. || 
|-id=577
| 296577 Arkhangelsk ||  || Arkhangelsk, city and first Russian seaport founded in 1584, on the banks of the Northern Dvina River near the White sea || 
|}

296601–296700 

|-id=638
| 296638 Sergeibelov ||  || Sergei Belov (1944–2013), a Soviet basketball player, considered to be one of the best European basketball players of all time || 
|}

296701–296800 

|-id=753
| 296753 Mustafamahmoud ||  || Mustafa Mahmoud born Mustafa Kamal Mahmoud Husayn (1921–2009), an Egyptian scientist and a prolific author || 
|}

296801–296900 

|-id=819
| 296819 Artesian ||  || The Artesian archaeological expedition (AAE) was formed in 1987 and organized by Moscow State Pedagogical University on the territory of the Bosporan Kingdom in eastern Crimea. The research included archaeoastronomy and discovered several ancient astronomical observatories (Src). || 
|}

296901–297000 

|-id=905
| 296905 Korochantsev ||  || Vladimir Alexeevich Korochantsev (born 1934), a Russian journalist, publicist and writer || 
|-id=907
| 296907 Alexander ||  || Claudia Alexander (1959–2015), an American planetary scientist who served as the project manager for the Galileo mission to Jupiter and the U.S. project scientist for the Rosetta mission. || 
|-id=928
| 296928 Francescopalla ||  || Francesco Palla (1954–2016) was an Italian astronomer, known for his contributions to the field of star formation. He was Director of the Arcetri Astrophysical Observatory from 2005 to 2011, and author of more than 300 scientific papers. Palla coauthored, with Steve Stahler, the textbook The Formation of Stars. || 
|-id=950
| 296950 Robertbauer ||  || A. Robert Bauer Sr., MD (1897–1984) successfully combined oxygen, heat, humidity and ease of nursing care in 1931 to create the first modern neonatal intensive care unit-grade incubator. Roughly one in eight infants are born prematurely, and many of them have benefited from Bauer's invention. || 
|-id=968
| 296968 Ignatianum ||  || Ignatianum is the Jesuit University of Philosophy and Education in Krakow, Poland || 
|-id=987
| 296987 Piotrflin ||  || Piotr Flin (born 1945), a Polish astronomer and a Professor at Jan Kochanowski University in Kielce, Poland || 
|}

References 

296001-297000